NWL is the debut studio album by American pop artist MAX. Originally intended to be The Nothing Without Love EP, the album was funded by donations through Kickstarter. It was only released to those who supported the Kickstarter.

Track listing

References

2015 albums
Max Schneider albums
Kickstarter-funded albums